The Final Testament of the Holy Bible is a novel written by James Frey, published by Gagosian Gallery in 2011. The book is published in the UK by John Murray with the shortened title The Final Testament.

Reception 
Michael Lindgren of The Washington Post gave the book a generally positive review, calling it a "strong and absorbing piece of writing" that "moves to its own inner spirit," and describing Frey's prose as having "undergone a miraculous transformation of its own... [with] an exceptionally expressive range of voice."

References

External links

2011 American novels
Novels by James Frey